Kirill Prokofyevich Orlovsky ( – 13 January 1968) was a Soviet partisan commander, a functionary of the Soviet state security agencies (Cheka-GPU-NKVD), and the chairman of a major kolkhoz. He was a recipient of the Hero of the Soviet Union award for courage during fighting the Nazi occupation behind enemy lines.

Early life and career
In 1906, he entered the Popovshchina parochial school, graduating in 1910. In 1915, he was drafted into the Imperial Russian Army, first serving as a private in the 251st reserve infantry regiment and from 1917, as a non-commissioned officer in the 65th Siberian rifle regiment, commanding a sapper platoon, seeing action at the Western Front of World War I. In January 1918, he was demobilized, returning to his native village. 

He then worked in the NKVD of the Byelorussian SSR and trained partisan detachments.  

In 1936 worked as the head of the GULAG section on the construction of the Moscow-Volga canal. In 1937-1938 he commanded combat missions during the Spanish Civil War, where he fought in the rear of the fascist troops as commander of sabotage and guerrilla groups.

In World War II 
In 1941, he was sent a special mission in Western China, from where, at his personal request, he was recalled and sent to the deep rear of the German invaders as the commander of a reconnaissance and sabotage group. He was reinstated in the service in the organs and became a member of the Special Group of the NKVD, headed by Pavel Sudoplatov.

On February 17 and 18, 1943, a 12 man detachment under the command of Orlovsky attacked the convoy of the General Commissioner of Belarus Wilhelm Kube on one of the roads. As a result of the raid, Hauptcommissar Friedrich Fenz , SS Obergruppenfuehrer Zacharius, as well as 10 officers and more than 30 soldiers were killed.

Orlovsky's detachment did not suffer losses however Orlovsky himself was seriously wounded. His right arm was amputated along the shoulder with an ordinary saw without anesthesia, 4 fingers on the left, and the auditory nerve was damaged by 50-60%. In August he was recalled to Moscow.

Post war service 
After his injuries he wrote a letter to Soviet authorities and asked for giving services in non-military fields.

Further in the letter, he asked to be allowed to head a collective farm in his native village.

KP Orlovsky's request was satisfied by the USSR Government. He received a recommendation and in January 1945 was elected chairman of the collective farm "Rassvet" of the Kirov district of the Mogilev region. 

From 1956 to 1961 he was a candidate member of the CPSU Central Committee.

He died on January 13, 1968 . Buried in the village of Myshkovichi, Kirovsky district, Mogilev region of Belarus.

References

1895 births
1968 deaths
People from Kirawsk District
People from Bobruysky Uyezd
Central Committee of the Communist Party of the Soviet Union candidate members
Third convocation members of the Soviet of the Union
Fourth convocation members of the Soviet of the Union
Fifth convocation members of the Soviet of the Union
Sixth convocation members of the Soviet of the Union
Seventh convocation members of the Soviet of Nationalities
NKVD officers
Russian military personnel of World War I
Soviet military personnel of the Russian Civil War
Soviet people of the Spanish Civil War
Soviet partisans
Belarusian partisans
Heroes of the Soviet Union
Heroes of Socialist Labour
Recipients of the Order of Lenin
Recipients of the Order of the Red Banner